Lenga may refer to:

 Nothofagus pumilio, a tree or shrub native to the Andes and also known as lenga beech
 Lenga, Johor, a town in Johor, Malaysia